= House E. S. Lobkova =

- Дом Е. С. Лобковой (Russian)
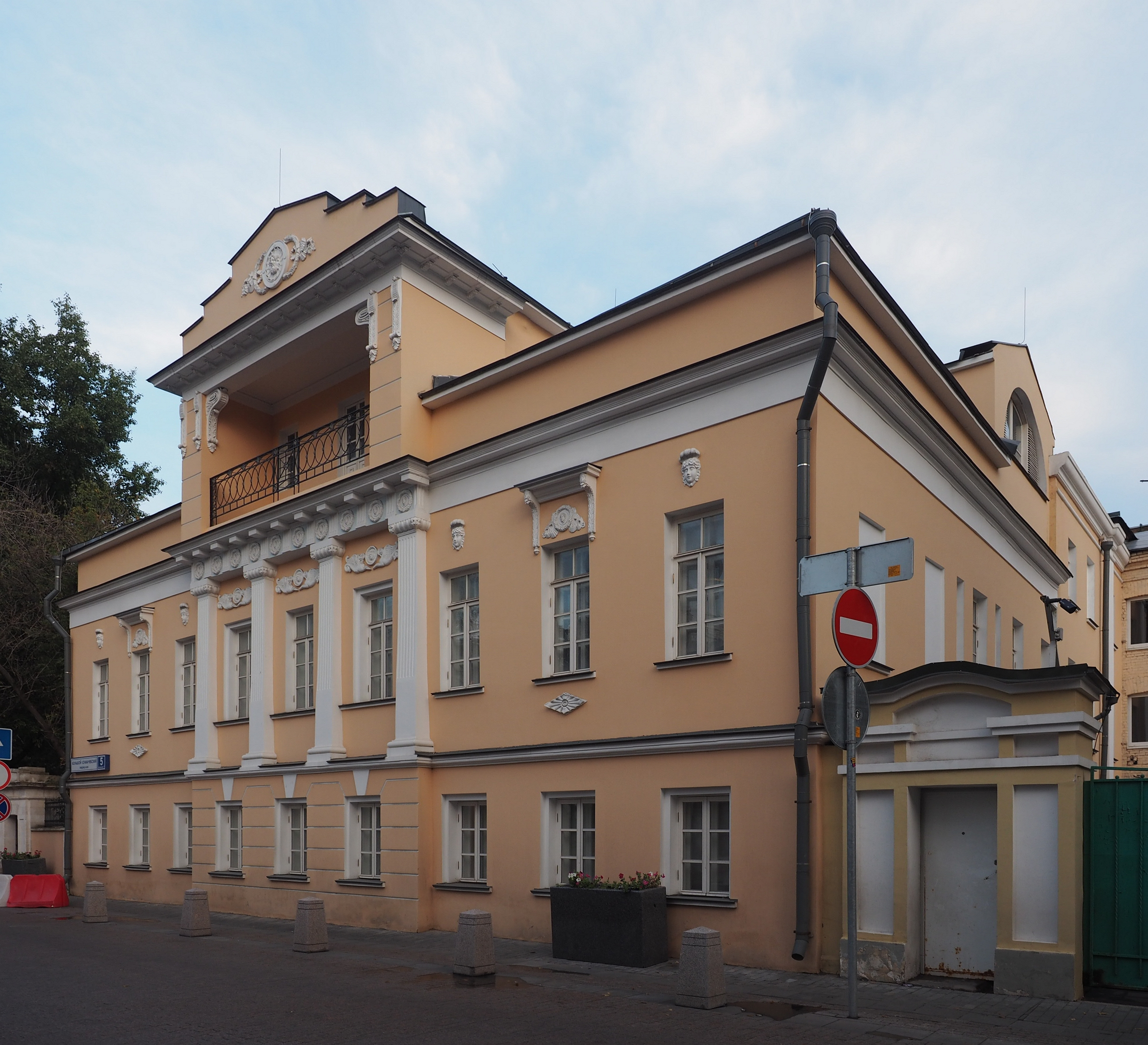
- Interactive map of the House E. S. Lobkova area

General information
- Location: Moscow, Big Tolmachevsky lane, house 5, building 7
- Coordinates: 55°44′25″N 37°37′13″E
- Completed: 1817

The House E. S. Lobkova (Russian: Дом Е. С. Лобковой) is a mansion in the center of Moscow (Big Tolmachevsky lane, house 5, building 7). Built in 1807 in Empire style. Currently, it is the representative office of the Altai Republic. The house of E. S. Lobkova has the status of an object of cultural heritage of Federal importance.

== History and architecture ==
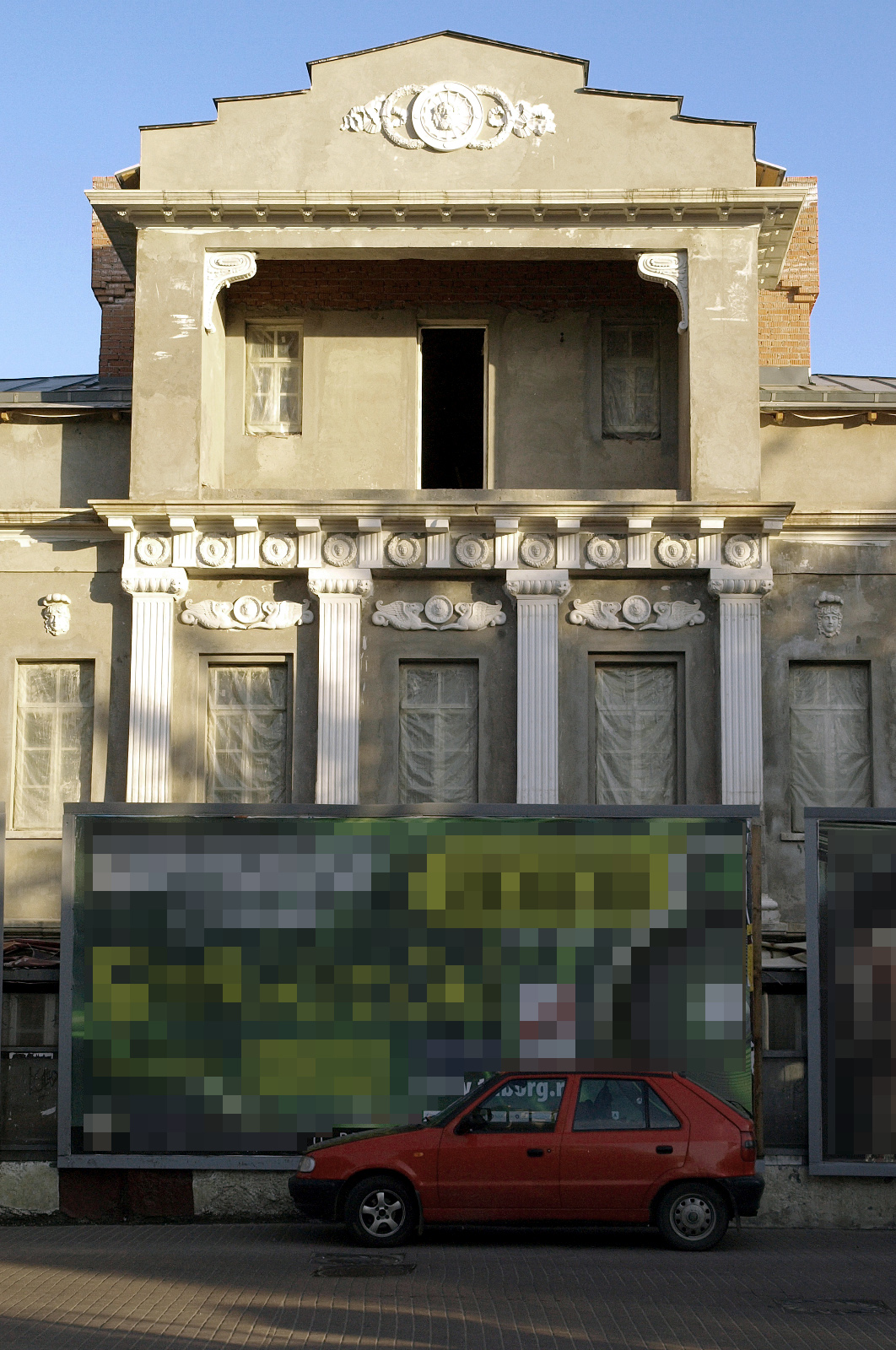
House in 2008 during the restoration

The House on Bolshoi Tolmachevsky lane was built in 1807 for podporujici Ekaterina Pubic. From 1852 until 1861 it belonged to the Medyntsev merchants, after 1861 it belonged instead to the Losev merchants.

Originally the mansion was U-shaped in plan. In the 1850s, extensions were made from the yard. In the 1860s, the mezzanine, where the loggia was built, was redesigned. At the beginning of the 21st century the mansion was restored. Now it houses the representative office of the Altai territory.

The house has two floors and a wooden mezzanine. The Central part of the mansion is allocated with a small risalit and a fluted pilaster portico on the second floor, topped with a frieze with metopes and triglyphs. Above it is the most expressive detail of the house-a deep loggia of the mezzanine, fenced with a thin metal lattice. The ceiling of the loggia is visually supported by two moulded brackets. Above the windows of the second floor, stucco decorations are placed. To the left of the house is the pylon of the gate.
